Kate Fox is a social anthropologist and author.

Kate Fox may also refer to:
Kate Fox (writer), British poet, author, and comedian
Kate M. Fox (born 1955), American lawyer and judge
Kate Fox (1837–1892), one of the Fox sisters: 19th-century spiritualist hoaxers

See also
Katy Fox, a character on the TV program Hollyoaks
Catherine Fox (disambiguation)